Adriana Maggs is a Canadian film and television actress, writer and director, best known for her debut feature film Grown Up Movie Star.

The daughter of academic and poet Randall Maggs, she is originally from Corner Brook, Newfoundland and Labrador. She was educated at Memorial University of Newfoundland's Grenfell College campus in Corner Brook, where she was a classmate of Sherry White, Susan Kent and Jonny Harris.

She has appeared as an actress in the television series Hatching, Matching and Dispatching, Three Chords from the Truth and Call Me Fitz and the films Down to the Dirt and Rabbittown, and she has written for the television series Hatching, Matching and Dispatching, Call Me Fitz, Three Chords from the Truth, The Wilkinsons, The Smart Woman Survival Guide, Rookie Blue and King.

She was a Genie Award nominee for Best Screenplay at the 31st Genie Awards in 2011 for Grown Up Movie Star, and was a cowinner of the Gemini Award for Best Ensemble Performance in a Comedy Program or Series at the 24th Gemini Awards in 2009 for Three Chords from the Truth.

Maggs directed season two of How to Buy a Baby.

See also
 List of female film and television directors
 List of LGBT-related films directed by women

References

External links

Living people
Year of birth missing (living people)
Canadian film actresses
Canadian television actresses
Canadian television writers
Canadian women film directors
Canadian women screenwriters
Canadian women television writers
Actresses from Newfoundland and Labrador
Writers from Newfoundland and Labrador
People from Corner Brook
Memorial University of Newfoundland alumni
Canadian Screen Award winners
21st-century Canadian screenwriters
21st-century Canadian women writers
Film producers from Newfoundland and Labrador